Bulungʻur District is a district of Samarqand Region in Uzbekistan. The capital lies at the city Bulungʻur.

The district consists of one city (Bulungʻur), 3 urban-type settlements (Kildon, Soxibkor, Bogʻbon) and 7 rural communities.

References 

Samarqand Region
Districts of Uzbekistan